Ettienne Richardson (born April 23, 1981) is a Grenadian football player. He is a striker for the Grenada national football team. Between 2005 and 2012, he has appeared in 6 international matches for Grenada, after his debut against Barbados.

External links

Grenadian footballers
Living people
1981 births
Grenada international footballers
Place of birth missing (living people)
Association football forwards
21st-century Grenadian people